Robert James Zdarsky (June 3, 1950 – March 30, 2015), better known by his stage name Robert Z'Dar, was an American character actor and film producer, best known for his role as officer Matt Cordell in the cult horror film Maniac Cop and its two sequels.

Z'Dar worked mainly in low-budget B-movies and direct-to-video features, but occasionally in mainstream Hollywood films and television. Due to his cherubism, a medical condition resulting in an enlarged jawline, Z'dar had a unique and easily recognizable look with a slightly sinister appearance, which aided his career as he usually portrayed villains.

A prolific actor, Z'Dar appeared in 121 films over the course of his 39-year career.

Early life
Born in Chicago, Illinois, Z'Dar was of Lithuanian descent.  He first started acting while attending Proviso West High School in Hillside, Illinois. After high school, Z'Dar attended Arizona State University where he received a BFA and played on the university football team. After graduation, Z'Dar returned to Chicago where he was employed as a Chicago police officer, member of the band Nova Express, commercial jingle writer and Chippendales dancer.

Acting career
Eventually Z'Dar moved to Los Angeles to pursue a career in acting. His first feature film appearance was in the women in prison film Hellhole (1985).

Z'Dar appeared in several films, including Hot Chili (1985), The Night Stalker (1987), Cherry 2000 (1987), The Killing Game (1988), and Grotesque (1988). Z'Dar's name became recognizable when he played Matt Cordell in 1988's Maniac Cop, a film about a back from the dead hero NYPD cop turned evil avenger who brutally murders people. Z'Dar reprised his role in the 1990 sequel and Badge of Silence (1993).

It was perhaps Z'Dar's performance in Maniac Cop that landed him the role of "Face" in 1989's Tango & Cash, alongside action stars Sylvester Stallone and Kurt Russell. He went on to appear in films such as Killing American Style (1988),The Final Sanction (1990), A Gnome Named Gnorm (1990), Beastmaster 2: Through the Portal of Time (1991), Mobsters (1991), Samurai Cop (1991), Return to Frogtown (1993), Marching Out of Time (1993), Death from Above (2011), Meltdown (2009) and Easter Sunday (2014). It was Z'Dar's performance and unique appearance in Tango and Cash that inspired Sean Pertwee's facial technique and makeup in the film Dog Soldiers. Sean was quoted as being inspired by Z'Dar because, "[...] like me, he has unusual features that are almost designed to portray grimacing death with profound accuracy and very little effort".

Robert Z'Dar appeared in more than 121 films and television episodes, with at least one film appearance per year in 27 of the last 29 years of his career (missing only 1986 and 2001). He continued making at least one film every year despite a serious back injury he suffered in 2002 on a movie set. Two of Z'Dar's films, Soultaker (1990) and Future War (1997) appeared in season 10 of Mystery Science Theater 3000, increasing his renown somewhat.

In 2012, he was inducted to International Indie Filmmakers Hall of Fame at The Indie Gathering film festival.

Death
While appearing at Pensacon in Pensacola, Florida, Z'Dar was hospitalized for chest pains. He seemed to recover, but subsequently went into cardiac arrest and died on March 30, 2015, one month after his hospitalization.

Filmography

References

External links

1950 births
2015 deaths
20th-century American male actors
21st-century American male actors
Male actors from Chicago
Chicago Police Department officers
American male film actors
Film producers from Illinois
American male television actors
American people of Lithuanian descent
Arizona State University alumni
Film producers from Arizona